Black Messiah is a German Viking / symphonic black metal band, founded in 1992.

History
Having started as a pure black metal band, Black Messiah's sound evolved to Viking metal with the release of their Oath of a Warrior album. They have released seven full-length albums.

Members

Current line-up
 Zagan RD - bass (1992-2000), vocals (1992-present), guitars, violin, mandolin (1996–present)
 Garm - bass (2001-2004, 2006–present)
 Ymir - guitars (2012–present)
 Ask - keyboard (2014–present)
 Donar (Patrick Donath) - guitars (2015–present)
 Surtr - drums (2015–present)

Former members
 Reverend Heidenbluth - drums (1992-1996)
 Frohnleichnam - guitars (1992-1996)
 Nabahm - drums (1997-2001)
 Drahco - bass (2004-2005)
 Surthur - drums (2004-2006)
 Zoran Novak - guitars (2004-2010)
 Meldric - guitars (2004-2012)
 Hrym - keyboards (2004-2006)
 Niörd - bass (2005-2006)
 Agnar - keyboards (2001-2004, 2006-2014)
 Fringes - guitars (2010-2014)
 Mike 'Brööh' Broker - drums (2001-2004, 2006–present)

Timeline

Discography

Albums
 Sceptre of Black Knowledge (1998)
 Oath of a Warrior (2005)
 Of Myths and Legends (2006)
 First War of the World (2009)
 The Final Journey (2012)
 Heimweh (2013)
 Walls of Vanaheim (2017)

Demos
 Southside Golgotha (1995)
 Demo 2001 (2001)
 Roughmix 2004 (2004)
 Futhark (2004)

External links
Black Messiah's official homepage
 
Black Messiah at AFM Records
Black Messiah at Metal Archives

German heavy metal musical groups
German black metal musical groups
Viking metal musical groups
Symphonic black metal musical groups
Musical groups established in 1992